Tálknafjörður is a fjord located in southern Westfjords between Patreksfjörður and Bildudalur in Iceland.

The term is also used for the immediate village and municipality. In January 2011, the municipality had 306 inhabitants, of whom 294 lived within the town proper.

On the land side the municipality is surrounded by the municipality of Vesturbyggð. There is considerable cooperation between the two municipalities but unification was voted down in the latest election. The town of Tálknafjörður was formerly named Sveinseyri  or Tunga . By road, the distance to Ísafjörður, the largest city in the West Fjords, is 137 km, and 403 km to Reykjavík. This distance can be significantly shortened by the ferry from Brjánslækur  to Stykkishólmur.

Since 2006, there has been a small group of summerhouses for sea angling tourists in Tálknafjörður. The houses are owned by Iceland Sea Angling.

References

Populated places in Westfjords
Municipalities of Iceland
Fjords of Iceland